The painted francolin or painted partridge (Francolinus pictus) is a species of francolin found in grassy areas in central and southern India and in the lowlands of southeastern Sri Lanka. They are easily detected by their loud calls especially during the breeding season. Thomas C. Jerdon noted that the species was found mainly in Central India south of the Narmada and to the east of the Western Ghats as well as the Chota Nagpur and Northern Circars. It can be confused only with the black francolin with which it partly overlaps and is said to sometimes hybridize. This species can be told apart from a black francolin female by the lack of a rufous hind collar and the white spots on the underside. The face is rufous and there is no dark stripe running behind the eye.

Description
This species is endemic to the Indian subcontinent. It is distributed patchily from Rajasthan and Uttar Pradesh south into peninsular India (but not along the Malabar coast and rare south of Coimbatore) and in Sri Lanka. The species interbreeds with the black francolin along its northern and appears similar to the female of that species but has no rufous hindcollar, instead having a bright rufous face and throat. The underside has white spots while the legs are orange-yellow to red. It is more arboreal in its habits than the black francolin. The legs of both sexes have no spurs.

The species was described by P. J. Selby based on a specimen obtained by his nephew John Atherton of Bangalore (commemorated in Nyctyornis athertoni). The type locality has been designated as Bangalore although the specimen likely came from further north.

Three subspecies have been named. The nominate population are from Central and South India south of 20°N while to the north is the form pallidus (type locality Udaipur). This form is paler on the upperparts. The Sri Lankan race is watsoni. In Sri Lanka it has a restricted distribution and is found from the Uvala patinas east to the low-country of Nilgala and Bibile.

Populations change during and after the monsoons, and hunters have been known to capture nearly 300 from some areas.

Distribution and habitat
The distribution of this species is to the south of the range of the black francolin. It is found patchily distributed in semi-dry undulating grasslands with scrub or cultivation. It is found in drier areas than the black francolin but wetter zones than the grey francolin.

Behaviour and ecology

They are not easy to spot but become vocal during the breeding season after the Monsoons, from June to October. The call is made in the early morning and has been described as guttural broken crow "chee-kee-kerray- Chee-kee-kerray" which is answered by other birds in the vicinity. A preliminary click may be heard when at close range. It is usually seen calling from an elevated position such as a mound, bush or tree stump. During the non-breeding season, they may call at dusk. The nest is a scrape in the ground. Six or seven smoky white eggs are laid.

They feed on grass seeds (including Brachiaria ramosa) as well as grains of cultivated rice. Beetles and other insects are also eaten. They also feed on the tuberous roots of Cyperus rotundus.

When walking around it sometimes has the habit of cocking up its tail and when disturbed it usually freezes and flushes only when approached very close. It roosts in trees and sometimes also on the ground.

In culture
This bird appears in a 4.50 rupee Sri Lankan postal stamp.

References

External links
 Internet Bird Collection

painted francolin
Birds of India
Birds of Sri Lanka
painted francolin
Taxa named by Sir William Jardine
painted francolin